The Saskatoon Light Infantry was an infantry regiment of the Non-Permanent Active Militia of the Canadian Militia (now the Canadian Army). The regiment was formed in 1924, when The North Saskatchewan Regiment (1920–1924) was reorganized into four separate regiments. In 1955, the regiment was amalgamated with The Prince Albert and Battleford Volunteers to form The North Saskatchewan Regiment.

Lineage 

 Originated on 1 April 1912, in Saskatoon, Saskatchewan, as the 105th Regiment.
 Redesignated on 16 September 1912, as the 105th Regiment Fusiliers.
 Redesignated on 15 April 1914, as the 105th Regiment (Saskatoon Fusiliers).
 Amalgamated on 15 March 1920, with the 52nd Regiment Prince Albert Volunteers and redesignated as The North Saskatchewan Regiment.
 Reorganized on 15 May 1924, as four separate regiments: The Yorkton Regiment (now the 64th Field Battery, 10th Field Artillery Regiment, RCA), The Battleford Light Infantry, The Prince Albert Volunteers, and The Saskatoon Light Infantry.
 Amalgamated on 15 December 1936, with C Company of the 12th Machine Gun Battalion, CMGC (now The Royal Regina Rifles) and redesignated as The Saskatoon Light Infantry (Machine Gun).
 Redesignated on 7 November 1940, as the 2nd (Reserve) Battalion, The Saskatoon Light Infantry (Machine Gun).
 Redesignated on 1 November 1945, as The Saskatoon Light Infantry (Machine Gun).
 Amalgamated on 17 February 1955, with The Prince Albert and Battleford Volunteers (Machine Gun) to form the 2nd Battalion, The North Saskatchewan Regiment (The Saskatoon Light Infantry) (Machine Gun).
 Amalgamated on 1 September 1970, with the 1st Battalion, The North Saskatchewan Regiment (The Prince Albert and Battleford Volunteers) to form a single-battalion unit, The North Saskatchewan Regiment.

Perpetuations 

 5th Battalion (Western Cavalry), CEF
 65th Battalion (Saskatchewan), CEF

History

Early history 
On 15 May 1924, The North Saskatchewan Regiment was split up and reorganized into four separate regiments: The Saskatoon Light Infantry, The Yorkton Regiment (now the 64th Field Battery, RCA), The Prince Albert Volunteers and The Battleford Light Infantry.

On 15 December 1936, as a result of the 1936 Canadian Militia reorganization, The Saskatoon Light Infantry was amalgamated with C Company, 12th Machine Gun Battalion, CMGC and reorganized as a machine gun infantry battalion. As a result, the regiment was redesignated as The Saskatoon Light Infantry (Machine Gun).

Second World War

Home front 
On 26 August 1939, details of The Saskatoon Light Infantry (Machine Gun) were called out for service and on 1 September 1939, were placed on active service under the designation as The Saskatoon Light Infantry (Machine Gun), CASF for local protection duties. On 31 December 1940, those details on active service were disbanded.

Europe 
On 1 September 1939, the regiment subsequently mobilized The Saskatoon Light Infantry (Machine Gun), CASF for active service, and on 8 December 1939, the battalion embarked for Great Britain as part of the 1st Canadian Infantry Division. On 7 November 1940, the battalion was again redesignated as the 1st Battalion, The Saskatoon Light Infantry (Machine Gun), CASF. On 25 August 1941, the battalion participated in the expedition to Spitzbergen, Norway. On 1 May 1943, the battalion was redesignated as the 1st Infantry Division Support Battalion (The Saskatoon Light Infantry), CIC, CASF. On 10 July 1943, the battalion as part of the 1st Canadian Infantry Division landed in Sicily as part of Operation Husky. On 3 September 1943, the battalion and the rest of the 1st Canadian Infantry Division as part of the British Army's V Corps landed in Italy where it fought as part of the Italian campaign, later joining with the rest of the 1st Canadian Infantry Division as part of the I Canadian Corps. On 1 July 1944, the battalion was again redesignated as the 1st Battalion, The Saskatoon Light Infantry (Machine Gun), CASF. On 4 March 1945, the battalion landed in France and upon arrival in the North West Europe theatre of operations with the rest of the First Canadian Army, it served until the end of the war. On 15 October 1945, the overseas battalion was disbanded.

Pacific 
On 1 June 1945, The Saskatoon Light Infantry (Machine Gun) mobilized three “cannon” companies for active service with the 6th Canadian Infantry Division (Canadian Army Pacific Force). On 1 November 1945, these companies were disbanded.

Organization

The Saskatoon Light Infantry (M.G.) (15 December 1936) 

 Regimental HQ (Saskatoon)
 A Company (Saskatoon)
 B Company (Saskatoon)
 C Company (Melfort)
 D Company (Saskatoon)

Alliances 
 - The King's Own Yorkshire Light Infantry (1925-1955)

Uniform 
Scarlet tunic with blue facings

Tartan: Mackenzie (pipers' kilts, 1942-1955, with permission of The Seaforth Highlanders of Canada)

Battle honours

Great War 

 Ypres, 1915, '17
 Gravenstafel
 St. Julien
 Festubert, 1915
 Mount Sorrel
 Somme, 1916
 Thiepval
 Ancre Heights
 Arras, 1917, '18
 Vimy, 1917
 Arleux
 Hill 70
 Passchendaele
 Amiens
 Scarpe, 1918
 Drocourt-Quéant
 Hindenburg Line
 Canal du Nord
 Pursuit to Mons
 France and Flanders, 1915–18

Second World War 

 Landing in Sicily
 Valguarnera
 Agira
 Adrano
 Sicily, 1943
 The Gully
 Ortona
 Cassino II
 Gustav Line
 Liri Valley
 Hitler Line
 Gothic Line
 Lamone Crossing
 Rimini Line
 Cesena
 Savio Bridgehead
 Naviglio Canal
 Fosso Vecchio
 Fosso Munio
 Italy, 1943-1945
 Apeldoorn
 North-West Europe, 1945

Notes and references 

North Saskatchewan Regiment
Light Infantry regiments of Canada
Military units and formations of Saskatchewan
Infantry regiments of Canada in World War II